The South Africa women's cricket team toured Australia in 1998–99, playing three women's One Day Internationals.  Australia won the series 2–0, with the third match abandoned without a ball being bowled.

One Day International series

1st ODI

2nd ODI

3rd ODI

References

1999 in South African cricket
1999 in South African women's sport
1999 in women's cricket
1998–99 Australian women's cricket season
February 1999 sports events in Australia
International cricket competitions from 1997–98 to 2000
Australia 1998-99
Women 1998-99
South Africa 1998-99